Bedford High School is a rural public high school located in Bedford, Iowa, United States. It is one of two high schools in Taylor County. A majority of the student population comes from the towns of Bedford, Blockton, Gravity, Conway, and New Market while some students open enroll from neighboring districts in the area.  The school's enrollment is approximately 135 students (9–12) and is administered by the Bedford Community School District. Its official mascot is the Bulldog, and its official colors are Navy and White.

Academics
Bedford offers a wide variety of courses for students to choose from. They also allow students to take college courses through Iowa Western Community College in Clarinda, Iowa.  Many students choose to further their educations at various colleges in the United States, while some students choose to enter military service, or the workforce following graduation. Currently, 26.66 credits (plus 1 credit of Physical Education) are required for a student to receive their diploma at graduation.

Sports
The Bedford Bulldogs and Lady Bulldogs compete in the Pride of Iowa Conference in Class 1A in most sports. (Class 8-Player in Football and shares  wrestling with Lenox High School.)

The Bedford Bulldogs football program has qualified for the Iowa High School Athletic Association playoffs 17 times and won the Class A State Championship in 1992. The Bulldogs and Lady Bulldogs have also qualified for state in Volleyball, Boys Basketball , Girls Basketball, Wrestling, Boys Golf, and Softball.

State Championships
The Bulldogs were the 1992 Class A Football State Champions.

Activities
Bedford students have a variety of extracurricular activities and organizations they can also participate in. Some of the activities a student may participate in include. (Not a complete list)
FFA- (Future Farmers of America), FCCLA- (Future Community and Career Leaders of America), SADOBS- (Speech and Drama of Bedford Schools), BPA- (Business Professionals of America), Art Club, Band, Chorus, Cheerleading, Student Government, Academic Bowl, and other various organizations and clubs.

See also
List of high schools in Iowa

References

External links 

Public high schools in Iowa
Schools in Taylor County, Iowa
1880 establishments in Iowa